Aa fiebrigii is a species of orchid in the genus Aa. It is found in Bolivia and northwest Argentina.

References

fiebrigii
Plants described in 1912